In Micronesian mythology, Motikitik is a mythological hero, famous for his fishing feats.

References

Micronesian deities